The American Institute in Taiwan (AIT) is the de facto Embassy of the United States of America in Taiwan. The AIT institution is a wholly-owned subsidiary of the federal government of the United States in Taiwan with Congressional oversight.  The AIT was officially created as a U.S. government-sponsored non-profit, private corporation established under the auspices of the U.S. government to serve its interests in Taiwan. Primarily staffed by employees of the United States Department of State and local workers, the AIT provides consular services normally offered by United States diplomatic missions, with the Great Seal of the State Department hung at AIT's main office in Taipei. The establishment of diplomatic relations with the People's Republic of China (PRC) in 1979 required acknowledgment of the "one-China policy" and subsequent termination of diplomatic relations with the Republic of China (Taiwan). The AIT now serves to assist and protect U.S. interests in Taiwan in a quasi-official manner, and also processes US visas and provides consular services to U.S. expatriates. Following the swift passage of the 2018 Taiwan Travel Act by the United States, it now serves as a high-level representative bureau on behalf of United States in Taiwan. It receives full protection from the United States Marine Corps as do all US embassies.

American Institute in Taiwan Kaohsiung Branch Office is a division of the AIT institution located in southern Taiwan.

Overview
AIT is a non-profit corporation incorporated in the District of Columbia on 16 January 1979 after the US established full diplomatic relations with the PRC on January 1, 1979.

Following the authorization of the Taiwan Relations Act, the Department of State, through a semi-official contract with AIT, provides guidance and "funds a large part of AIT’s operations".  Like other U.S. missions abroad, AIT is staffed by employees of the Department of State and other agencies of the United States, as well as by locally hired staff.  Prior to a 2002 amendment to the Foreign Service Act (Section 503 of the Foreign Service Act of 1980, as amended by the Foreign Relations Authorization Act, Fiscal Year 2003), United States government employees were required to resign from government service for their period of assignment to AIT. According to Section 12 (a) of the Taiwan Relations Act, agreements conducted by AIT have to be reported to Congress, just as other international agreements concluded by United States and governments with which it has diplomatic relations. Thus, while relations between the US and Taiwan through AIT are conducted on an informal basis, the US government still treats the relationship within the same confines as with other states with formal diplomatic relations.

AIT has a small headquarters office in Arlington County, Virginia with its largest office located in Taipei, Taiwan. The organization also has a branch office in Taiwan's strategic southern port city of Kaohsiung. These three bureaus are referred to as AIT/Washington (AIT/W), AIT/Taipei (AIT/T) and AIT/Kaohsiung (AIT/K), respectively.

The AIT office complex at No. 100 Jin Hu Road, Neihu District, Taipei, was inaugurated in 2019. AIT/Taipei was previously located in the Daan District on the former site of the U.S. Military Advisory Group headquarters before 1979.

For the purposes of remuneration and benefits, directors of the AIT hold the same rank as ambassador and, in Taiwan, are accorded diplomatic privileges in their capacity as directors.

Its counterpart in the United States is the Taipei Economic and Cultural Representative Office.

New compound in Taipei 

A new $250 million compound for the American Institute in Taiwan was unveiled in June 2018, accompanied by a "low-key" U.S. delegation and several mid-level diplomats. According to the AIT the new complex represents "the United State's brick-and-mortar commitment to Taiwan."

In 2019 director Christensen buried a time capsule at the new AIT complex in Neihu. The time capsule is not to be unearthed for 50 years.

Principal officers

List of directors

Charles T. Cross 1979 – 1981
James R. Lilley 1981 – 1984
Harry E. T. Thayer 1984 – 1986
 1987 – 1989
Thomas S. Brooks 1990 – 1993
B. Lynn Pascoe 1993 – 1996
Darryl Norman Johnson 1996 – 1999
Raymond Burghardt 1999 – 2001, received the Order of Propitious Clouds
Douglas H. Paal 2002 – 2006
Stephen Young 2006 – 2009
William A. Stanton 2009 – 2012
Christopher J. Marut 2012 – 2015
Kin W. Moy 2015 – 2018
Brent Christensen 2018 – 2021
Sandra Oudkirk 2021 – present

List of deputy directors
 William A. Brown 1979
William Wayt Thomas Jr. 1979 – 1981
Thomas S. Brooks 1981 – 1983
Jerome C. Ogden 1983 – 1986
Scott S. Hallford 1986 – 1991
James A. Larocco 1991 – 1993
Christopher J. LaFleur 1993 – 1997 
Lauren K. Moriarty 1997 – 1998
Stephen Young 1998 – 2001
Pamela J. H. Slutz 2001 – 2003
David J. Keegan 2003 – 2006
Robert S. Wang 2006 – 2009
Eric H. Madison 2009 – 2012
Brent Christensen 2012 – 2015
Robert W. Forden 2015 – 2018
Raymond F. Greene 2018 – 2021
Jeremy A. Cornforth 2021 – present

List of political section chiefs
The Political Section, originally known as the General Affairs Section (GAS), is led by a chief which is similar to a political counselor in other embassies.

Chiefs, General Affairs Section
Mark S. Pratt 1979 – 1981
Stanley R. Ifshin 1981 – 1983
David E. Reuther 1983 – 1985
Joseph J. Borich 1985 – ?
Thomas V. Biddick 1989 – 
Douglas G. Spelman 
James F. Moriarty 1995 – 1998
Eunice Reddick 1997 – 2000

Chiefs, Political Section
Joseph R. Donovan Jr. 2000 – 2003
Melvin T. L. Ang 2003 – 2004
James L. Huskey 2004 – 2008
David H. Rank 2008 – 2010
Daniel Turnbull 2010 – 2013
William Klein 2013 – 2016
Christian M. Marchant 2016 – 2019 
Bradley S. Parker 2019 – present

List of commercial officers
William D. McClure 1981 – 1986
Raymond Sander 1987 – 1997
William Brekke 1997 – 2000
Terry Cooke 2000 – 2003
Gregory Loose 2003 – 2006
Gregory Wong 2006 – 2010
Helen Hwang 2010–
Scott Pozil 2011 – 2013
Amy Chang 2010 – 2013
Robert Leach (Kaohsiung) 2000 – 2003
Steve Green (Kaohsiung) 2009 – 2011
Gregory Harris (Kaohsiung) 2011 –
See AIT Commercial Section

List of chairmen

David Dean 1979 – 1986
David N. Laux 1986 – 1990
Natale H. Bellocchi 1990 – 1995
James C. Wood Jr. 1996 – 1997
Richard C. Bush 1997 – 2002
Therese Shaheen 2002 – 2004
 William A. Brown 2004 – 2006 (Acting)
Raymond Burghardt 2006 – October 2016
James F. Moriarty October 2016 – present

See also

 De facto embassy
Taiwan–United States relations
Taipei Economic and Cultural Representative Office in the United States, its counterpart
Foreign relations of Taiwan
Foreign relations of the United States
Foreign policy of the United States
Political status of Taiwan

References

External links

 
 
  

 
Taiwan–United States relations
1979 establishments in Washington, D.C.
Representative Offices in Taipei
Taipei
1979 establishments in Taiwan
Diplomatic missions in Washington, D.C.